Jama railway station (station code JAMA) is at Jama village city in Dumka district in the Indian state of Jharkhand on the Jasidih–Rampurhat section. It is in the Asansol railway division of the Eastern Railway zone of the Indian Railways.

This railway track to Dumka is a boon for Santhal Pargana Division.

The Jama railway station provides rail connectivity to the nearby villages Jarpura, Ghoribad, Silandah, Belkupi, Sugnibad.

History
Jama railway station became operation in 2011.

Station layout

Trains
One express and three passenger trains run between Jasidih Junction and Dumka stop at Jama railway station.

Track layout

See also

References

External links 

 Ministry of Railways. (Official site)

 Official website of the Dumka district

Railway stations in Dumka district
Asansol railway division
Railway stations opened in 2011